Marramarra National Park is a protected national park that is located in the Hawkesbury region of northwestern Sydney, New South Wales, in eastern Australia.

Description

The park is bounded by the Hawkesbury River in the north; Berowra Creek in the east; and private land to the south and west. The national park may be accessed from  via the Old Northern Road or from  via the Galston Road through the Galston Gorge.

The park is administered by Ku-ring-gai Chase National Park. It offers bushwalkers a wide range of environments, from the mangrove communities along Marramarra Creek to the drier, sclerophyll scrub along the ridges. Access is provided predominantly by fire trails and service roads, frequently alongside power lines, with no dedicated walking tracks.

Marramarra was a traditional area for the Aboriginal people of Darug. There are still places that testify to their traditional life here. Rock engravings, cave art, grinding grooves, scarred trees and other stone arrangements are part of this national park.

Gallery

Bibliography
  Treks in New South Wales, Neil Paton (Kangaroo Press) 1986,

See also

 Protected areas of New South Wales

References

External links
 
 
 
 
 
  [CC-By-SA]

National parks of New South Wales
Protected areas established in 1979
1979 establishments in Australia
Hawkesbury River
City of Hawkesbury